Deerfield-Windsor School is an independent K–12 coeducational college preparatory school in Albany, Georgia, United States.

History
Deerfield-Windsor School was founded in 1964 when eight men, led by William T. Bodenhamer, set out to establish a college preparatory school in Albany. They named their school Deerfield. The name Deerfield-Windsor School was chosen as a result of the 1978 merger of Deerfield School and Windsor Park Academy.

The school was founded as a segregation academy, but now has a non-discriminatory admissions policy.

Athletics
Deerfield-Windsor School athletics participate in 1A Region 1 Private and are members of the Georgia High School Association.

Boys
Baseball
Basketball
Cross Country
Football
Golf
Soccer
Swimming & Diving
Tennis
Track & Field
Wrestling

Girls
Basketball
Cheerleading
Cross Country
Golf
Soccer
Softball
Swimming & Diving
Tennis
Track & Field
Danceline

See also
List of schools in Georgia (U.S. state)

References

Educational institutions established in 1964
Private elementary schools in Georgia (U.S. state)
Private high schools in Georgia (U.S. state)
Private middle schools in Georgia (U.S. state)
Schools in Dougherty County, Georgia
Preparatory schools in Georgia (U.S. state)
1964 establishments in Georgia (U.S. state)
Segregation academies in Georgia